Abdullah Ibrahim (born Adolph Johannes Brand on 9 October 1934 and formerly known as Dollar Brand) is a South African pianist and composer. His music reflects many of the musical influences of his childhood in the multicultural port areas of Cape Town, ranging from traditional African songs to the gospel of the AME Church and Ragas, to more modern jazz and other Western styles. Ibrahim is considered the leading figure in the subgenre of Cape jazz. Within jazz, his music particularly reflects the influence of Thelonious Monk and Duke Ellington. He is known especially for "Mannenberg", a jazz piece that became a notable anti-apartheid anthem.

During the apartheid era in the 1960s Ibrahim moved to New York City and, apart from a brief return to South Africa in the 1970s, remained in exile until the early '90s. Over the decades he has toured the world extensively, appearing at major venues either as a solo artist or playing with other renowned musicians, including Max Roach, Carlos Ward and Randy Weston, as well as collaborating with classical orchestras in Europe. With his wife, the jazz singer Sathima Bea Benjamin, he is father to the New York underground rapper Jean Grae, as well as to a son, Tsakwe.

Biography
Ibrahim was born in Cape Town, South Africa, on 9 October 1934, and was baptized Adolph Johannes Brand. He attended Trafalgar High School in Cape Town's District Six, and began piano lessons at the age of seven, making his professional debut at 15. He is of mixed-race heritage, making him a Coloured person according to the apartheid system. His mother played piano in a church, the musical style of which would remain an influence; in addition, he learned to play several genres of music during his youth in Cape Town, including marabi, mbaqanga, and American jazz. He became well known in jazz circles in Cape Town and Johannesburg. In 1959 and 1960, Ibrahim played with the Jazz Epistles group in Sophiatown, alongside saxophonist Kippie Moeketsi, trumpeter Hugh Masekela, trombonist Jonas Gwangwa (who were all in the orchestra of the musical King Kong that opened in Johannesburg in February 1959), bassist Johnny Gertze and drummer Makaya Ntshoko; in January 1960, the six musicians went into the Gallo studio and recorded the first full-length jazz LP by Black South African musicians, Jazz Epistle Verse One, with 500 copies being produced. Although the group avoided explicitly political activity, the apartheid government was suspicious of it and other jazz groups, and targeted them heavily during the increase in state repression following the Sharpeville massacre in March 1960, and eventually, the Jazz Epistles broke up.

Exile
Ibrahim moved to Europe in 1962. In February 1963, his wife-to-be, Sathima Bea Benjamin (they married in 1965), convinced Duke Ellington, who was in Zürich, Switzerland, on a European tour, to come to hear Ibrahim perform as "The Dollar Brand Trio" in Zurich's "Africana Club". After the show, Ellington helped set up a recording session with Reprise Records: Duke Ellington presents The Dollar Brand Trio. A second recording of the trio (also with Ellington and Billy Strayhorn on piano) performing with Sathima as vocalist was recorded, but remained unreleased until 1996 (A Morning in Paris, under Benjamin's name). The Dollar Brand Trio (with Johnny Gertze on bass and Makaya Ntshoko on drums) subsequently played at many European festivals, as well as on radio and television.

Ibrahim and Benjamin moved to New York in 1965 and that year he played at the Newport Jazz Festival, followed by a first tour through the US; in 1966 Ibrahim substituted for Duke Ellington on five dates, leading the Duke Ellington Orchestra. In 1967, a Rockefeller Foundation grant enabled him to study at the Juilliard School of Music in New York. While in the US he interacted with many progressive musicians, among them Don Cherry, Ornette Coleman, John Coltrane, Pharoah Sanders, Cecil Taylor and Archie Shepp. As the Black Power movement developed in the 1960s and 1970s, it influenced a number of Ibrahim's friends and collaborators, who began to see their music as a form of cultural nationalism. Ibrahim in turn began to incorporate African elements into his jazz.

Return to South Africa
Ibrahim briefly returned to Cape Town in 1968, where he converted to Islam that year (with the resultant change of name from Dollar Brand to Abdullah Ibrahim) and in 1970 he made a pilgrimage to Mecca.

He met Rashid Vally at the latter's Kohinoor record shop in Johannesburg in the early 1970s, and Vally produced two of Ibrahim's albums in the following years. The pair produced a third album in 1974, titled Underground in Africa, in which Ibrahim abandoned his financially unsuccessful folk-infused jazz of the previous albums. Instead, the new album was a fusion of jazz, rock music, and South Africa popular music, and sold well. While recording Underground, Ibrahim collaborated with Oswietie, a local band of which Robbie Jansen and Basil Coetzee were saxophonists, and who played a large role in creating the album's fusion style. After the success of Underground, Ibrahim asked Coetzee to bring together a supporting band for his next recording: the group Coetzee put together included Jansen, as well as others who had not worked on Underground. The composition "Mannenberg" was recorded in June 1974 during one of Ibrahim's visits back to South Africa, in a studio in Cape Town, and was produced by Rashid Vally. The track was recorded in one take during a period of collective improvisation. The piece was inspired by the Cape Flats township where many of those forcibly removed from District Six were sent.

The recordings made with Jansen and Coetzee, including "Mannenberg" (renamed "Capetown Fringe" in its US release), "Black Lightning"; "African Herbs"; and "Soweto Is Where It Is At" – sounds that mirrored and spoke of the defiance in the streets and townships of South Africa – gave impetus to the genre of music known as "Cape Jazz." "Mannenberg" came to be considered "the unofficial national anthem" of South Africa, and the theme tune of the anti-apartheid movement. Saxophonist and flautist Carlos Ward was Ibrahim's sideman in duets during the early 1980s. A few months after the release of "Mannenberg", South African police fired upon protesting children during the Soweto Uprising that began on 16 June 1976; this event led Ibrahim and Benjamin to publicly express support for the African National Congress, which was still banned at the time.

Soon returning to the US and settling in New York, Ibrahim and Sathima founded the record company Ekapa in 1981.

Starting in 1983, Ibrahim led a group called Ekaya (which translates as "home"), as well as various trios, occasional big bands and other special projects.

Film and television work
Ibrahim has written the soundtracks for a number of films, including Chocolat (1988), and No Fear, No Die (1990).

On 25 November 1989 he made an extended appearance in the British Channel 4 television discussion series After Dark alongside Zoë Wicomb, Donald Woods, Shula Marks and others. Ibrahim also took part in the 2002 documentary Amandla!: A Revolution in Four-Part Harmony, where he and others recalled the days of apartheid; the film's subtitle derives from observations made by Ibrahim.
 
Ibrahim is the subject of the documentaries A Brother with Perfect Timing (1987) and A Struggle for Love (2005, directed by Ciro Cappellari).

Post-apartheid
Ibrahim has worked as a solo performer, typically in unbroken concerts that echo the unstoppable impetus of the old marabi performers, classical impressionists and snatches of his musical idols – Ellington, Thelonious Monk and Fats Waller. He also performs frequently with trios and quartets and larger orchestral units. Since his return to South Africa in the early 1990s, he has been feted with symphony orchestra performances, one of which was in honour of Nelson Mandela's 1994 inauguration as President. Mandela reportedly referred to him as "our Mozart".

In 1997, Ibrahim collaborated on a tour with drummer Max Roach, and the following year undertook a world tour with the Munich Radio Philharmonic Orchestra.

In 1999, he founded the "M7" academy for South African musicians in Cape Town and was the initiator of the Cape Town Jazz Orchestra, an 18-piece big band launched in September 2006.

Ibrahim continues to perform internationally, mainly in Europe, and with occasional shows in North America. Reviewing his 2008 concert at London's Barbican Centre – a "monumental" show with the BBC Big Band, featuring vocalists Ian Shaw and Cleveland Watkiss – John Fordham of The Guardian referred to "his elder-statesman status as the African Duke Ellington and Thelonious Monk combined (and his role as an educator and political campaigner)".

In 2016, at Emperors Palace, Johannesburg, Ibrahim and Hugh Masekela performed together for the first time in 60 years, reuniting the Jazz Epistles in commemoration of the 40th anniversary of the historic 16 June 1976 youth demonstrations.

Awards
In 2007, Ibrahim was presented with the South African Music Lifetime Achievement Award, given by the Recording Industry of South Africa, in a ceremony at the Sun City Superbowl.

In 2009, for his solo piano album Senzo he received the "Best Male Artist" award at the 15th Annual MTN South African Music Awards.

In 2009, the University of the Witwatersrand, Johannesburg, conferred on Ibrahim an Honorary Doctorate of Music. Also in 2009, he was awarded South Africa's national honour the Order of Ikhamanga (Silver), "For his excellent contribution to the arts, putting South Africa on the international map and his fight against racism and apartheid."

In July 2017, Ibrahim was honoured with the German Jazz Trophy.

In July 2018, the National Endowment for the Arts (NEA) announced Abdullah Ibrahim as one of four recipients of the NEA Jazz Masters Fellowships, to be celebrated in a concert on 15 April 2019 at the John F. Kennedy Center for the Performing Arts in Washington, DC. Awarded in recognition of lifetime achievement, the honor is bestowed on individuals who have made significant contributions to the art form, the other 2019 recipients being Bob Dorough, Maria Schneider, and Stanley Crouch.

Discography 
An asterisk (*) indicates that the year is that of release.

As leader/co-leader

Compilations

As sideman

Notes

References

Sources

External links

  – official site
 
 Maya Jaggi, "The Guardian Profile: Abdullah Ibrahim – The sound of freedom", The Guardian, 8 December 2001.
 "Abdullah Ibrahim", 100 Jazz Profiles, BBC Radio 3.
 Abdullah Ibrahim page, Africa is a Country.
 Philippa Kennedy, "Key note speaker", The National, 16 November 2008
 Diaa Bekheet, "Abdullah Ibrahim, 'King of Jazz' in South Africa", Voice of America, 26 May 2012.
 Nusra Khan, "Abdullah Ibrahim and the Politics of Jazz in South Africa", South African History Online, 18 December 2014, updated 20 October 2016
 Kevin Whitehead, "Pianist Abdullah Ibrahim Proves Himself A One-Man Movement On 'Ancient Africa'", NPR Music, 10 May 2017

1934 births
Living people
Musicians from Cape Town
Cape Coloureds
Converts to Islam
Post-bop pianists
South African folk musicians
South African jazz pianists
South African Muslims
Enja Records artists
South African jazz composers
20th-century jazz composers
African jazz (genre) pianists
21st-century pianists
The Jazz Epistles members
Alumni of Trafalgar High School (Cape Town)
Sackville Records artists
Black & Blue Records artists
Sunnyside Records artists
South African expatriates in the United States